The General Atomics MQ-9 Reaper (sometimes called Predator B) is an unmanned aerial vehicle (UAV) capable of remotely controlled or autonomous flight operations, developed by General Atomics Aeronautical Systems (GA-ASI) primarily for the United States Air Force (USAF). The MQ-9 and other UAVs are referred to as Remotely Piloted Vehicles/Aircraft (RPV/RPA) by the USAF to indicate ground control by humans.

The MQ-9 is the first hunter-killer UAV designed for long-endurance, high-altitude surveillance. In 2006, Chief of Staff of the United States Air Force General T. Michael Moseley said: "We've moved from using UAVs primarily in intelligence, surveillance, and reconnaissance roles before Operation Iraqi Freedom, to a true hunter-killer role with the Reaper."

The MQ-9 is a larger, heavier, more capable aircraft than the earlier General Atomics MQ-1 Predator and can be controlled by the same ground systems.  The Reaper has a 950-shaft-horsepower (712 kW) turboprop engine (compared to the Predator's  piston engine). The greater power allows the Reaper to carry 15 times more ordnance payload and cruise at about three times the speed of the MQ-1. The aircraft is monitored and controlled by aircrew in the Ground Control Station (GCS), including weapons employment.

In 2008, the New York Air National Guard 174th Attack Wing began the transition from F-16 piloted fighters to MQ-9A Reapers, becoming the first fighter unit to convert entirely to unmanned combat aerial vehicle (UCAV) use. In March 2011, the U.S. Air Force was training more pilots for advanced unmanned aerial vehicles than for any other single weapons system. The Reaper is also used by the U.S. Customs and Border Protection and the militaries of several other countries.

The USAF operated over 300 MQ-9 Reapers as of May 2021, with 16 additional units authorized by the FY2021 Congressional budget. Several MQ-9 aircraft had been retrofitted with equipment upgrades to improve performance in "high-end combat situations", and all new MQ-9s would have those upgrades. 2035 is the projected end of the service life of the MQ-9 fleet.

The average unit cost of an MQ-9 is estimated at $ million

Development

Origins
The General Atomics "Predator B-001", a proof-of-concept aircraft, first flew on 2 February 2001. Abraham Karem is the designer of the Predator.

The company refined the design, taking it in two separate directions. The first was a jet-powered version; "Predator B-002" was fitted with a Williams FJ44-2A turbofan engine with  thrust. The USAF ordered two airframes for evaluation, delivered in 2007. The first two airframes delivered with prototypes B-001 and B-002 (now in the USAF museum at Wright-Patterson AFB). B-002 was originally equipped with the FJ-44 engine but it was removed and a TPE-331-10T was installed so that the USAF could take delivery of two aircraft in the same configuration.

Like the Predator B-001, it is powered by a TPE-331-10YGD turboprop.

In October 2001, the USAF signed a contract for an initial pair of Predator Bs (001 and 002) for evaluation. Designated YMQ-9s due to their prototype role, they were delivered in 2002. The USAF referred to it as "Predator B" until it was renamed "Reaper". The USAF aimed for the Predator B to provide an improved "deadly persistence" capability, flying over a combat area night-and-day waiting for a target to present itself, complementing piloted attack aircraft, typically used to drop larger quantities of ordnance on a target, while a cheaper RPV can operate almost continuously using ground controllers working in shifts, but carrying less ordnance.

Operation

MQ-9 Reaper crews (pilots and sensor operators), stationed at bases such as Creech Air Force Base, near Las Vegas, Nevada, can hunt for targets and observe terrain using multiple sensors, including a thermographic camera. An operator's command takes 1.2 seconds to reach the drone via a satellite link.

The MQ-9 is fitted with six stores pylons. The inner stores pylons can carry a maximum of  each and allow carriage of external fuel tanks. The mid-wing stores pylons can carry a maximum of  each, while the outer stores pylons can carry a maximum of  each. The Reaper has an endurance of 14 hours when fully loaded with munitions.

The MQ-9 carries a variety of weapons including the GBU-12 Paveway II laser-guided bomb, the AGM-114 Hellfire II air-to-ground missiles, the AIM-9 Sidewinder, and the GBU-38 Joint Direct Attack Munition (JDAM). Tests are underway to allow for the addition of the AIM-92 Stinger air-to-air missile.

By October 2007, the USAF owned nine Reapers, and by December 2010 had 57 with plans to buy another 272, for a total of 329 Reapers. Critics have stated that the USAF's insistence on qualified pilots flying RPVs is a bottleneck to expanding deployment. USAF Major General William Rew stated on 5 August 2008, "For the way we fly them right now"—fully integrated into air operations and often flying missions alongside manned aircraft—"we want pilots to fly them." This reportedly has exacerbated losses of USAF aircraft in comparison with US Army operations. In March 2011, U.S. Department of Defense Secretary Robert Gates stated that, while manned aircraft are needed, the USAF must recognize "the enormous strategic and cultural implications of the vast expansion in remotely piloted vehicles..." and stated that as the service buys manned fighters and bombers, it must give equal weight to unmanned drones and "the service's important role in the cyber and space domains."

 the USAF had taken delivery of 287 out of 366 MQ-9 Reapers on contract with General Atomics. The total program quantity is set at 433, including Foreign Military Sales.

In 2013, the Air Force Special Operations Command (AFSOC) sought the ability to pack up an MQ-9 in less than eight hours, fly it anywhere in the world aboard a C-17 Globemaster III, and then have it ready to fly in another eight hours to support special operations teams at places with no infrastructure. MQ-1 and MQ-9 drones must fly aboard cargo aircraft to travel long distances as they lack the refueling technology or speed to travel themselves; the C-17 is large enough to carry the aircraft and support systems and can land on short runways. Pilots traveling with the Reaper will use the ground control station to launch and land the aircraft, while most of the flying will be done by US-based pilots.

Testbed and upgrades
In November 2012, Raytheon completed ground verification tests for the ADM-160 MALD and MALD-J for integration onto the Reaper for an unmanned suppression of enemy air defenses capability. On 12 April 2013, a company-owned MQ-9 equipped with a jamming pod and digital receiver/exciter successfully demonstrated its electronic warfare capability at Marine Corps Air Station (MCAS) Yuma, performing its mission in coordination with over 20 participating aircraft. A second electronic warfare test, fitted with the Northrop Grumman Pandora EW System, was conducted on 22 October 2013 with other unmanned aircraft and Northrop Grumman EA-6B Prowlers, showing effectiveness in a multi-node approach against a more capable IADS.

In 2011, the U.S. Missile Defense Agency (MDA) reported its interest in using the Reaper and its MTS-B sensor to provide firing quality data for early interception of ballistic missile launches. The MDA is exploring concepts to use the UAV's EO/IR sensor to achieve "launch-on-remote" capabilities with missile interceptors before detection by Aegis radars.  At least two aircraft would be needed to triangulate a target to provide high-fidelity data. The MTS-B includes short and mid-wave IR bands, optimal for tracking launch and rocket burn.

In 2013, the MDA terminated plans to build a follow-on to the two orbiting Space Tracking and Surveillance System (STSS) satellites due to near-term costs, opting to continue testing the Reaper for ballistic missile target discrimination. The MDA planned to test the improved MTS-C sensor, which adds a long-wave IR detector optimized for tracking cold bodies such as missiles and warheads after booster burnout, or plumes and exhaust. The goal is to use data from multiple high-flying UAVs to provide an offboard cue to launch an SM-3 missile from an Aegis ship. Two Reapers demonstrated their ability to track ballistic missiles using their MTS-B EO/IR turret during a test in late June 2016.

In June 2015, a study by the USAF's Scientific Advisory Board identified several improvements for operating the Reaper in contested airspace; adding readily available sensors, weapons, and threat detection and countermeasures could increase situational awareness and enable riskier deployments. Suggestions included a radar warning receiver (RWR) to know when it's being targeted, air-to-air and miniature air-to-ground weapons, manned-unmanned teaming, multi-UAV control, automatic take-offs and landings, and precision navigation and timing systems to fly in GPS-denied areas. Another idea was redesigned ground control stations with user-friendly video game-like controllers and touchscreen maps to access data without overwhelming operators.

In October 2015, Air Force Deputy Chief of Staff for ISR Robert Otto suggested redesigning the MQ-9's GCS to be operated by one person for most missions rather than two (to fly and work the sensors) to simplify operations and reduce manpower requirements by hundreds of sensor operators. Introducing an auto-land capability would also reduce the Reaper's manpower requirements to staff launch and recovery teams. Automatic take-off and landing capabilities are already present in the RQ-4 Global Hawk and MQ-1C Gray Eagle, and are planned to be provided to the MQ-9 in 2017.

In April 2017, an MQ-9 Block 5 flew with a Raytheon ALR-69A RWR in its payload pod to demonstrate the aircraft's ability to conduct missions in the proximity of threat radars and air defenses, the first time this capability was demonstrated on a remotely piloted aircraft. In September 2020, a Reaper was flown carrying two Hellfire missiles on each of the stations previously reserved for 500 lb bombs or fuel tanks. A software upgrade doubled the aircraft's capacity to eight missiles.

Pentagon wants to upgrade MQ-9 Reaper with directed-energy weapons such as low-powered laser and high-powered microwave beams. A high-field optical module to act on the human nervous system is also under consideration.

In September 2020, GA-ASI conducted captive carry tests of the Sparrowhawk small UAS on the MQ-9, with the Reaper itself acting as a drone mothership. The MQ-9B Sky Guardian will be able to carry up to four Sparrowhawks upon the sUAS's entry to service.

Design

A typical MQ-9 system consists of multiple aircraft, ground control station, communications equipment, maintenance spares, and personnel. A military flight crew includes a pilot, sensor operator, and Mission Intelligence Coordinator.

Its endurance is 30 hours when conducting ISR missions, which decreases to 23 hours if it is carrying a full weapons load.

The Predator and Reaper were designed for military operations and not intended to operate among crowded airline traffic. The aircraft typically lack systems capable of complying with FAA See-And-Avoid regulations. In 2005, requests were made for MQ-9s to be used in search and rescue operations following Hurricane Katrina but, as there was no FAA authorization in place at the time, it was not used. On 18 May 2006, the Federal Aviation Administration (FAA) issued a certificate of authorization allowing MQ-1 and MQ-9 UAVs to fly in U.S. civil airspace to search for survivors of disasters.

An MQ-9 can adopt various mission kits and combinations of weapons and sensors payloads to meet combat requirements. Its Raytheon AN/AAS-52 multi-spectral targeting sensor suite includes a color/monochrome daylight TV, infrared, and image-intensified TV with laser rangefinder/laser designator to designate targets for laser guided munitions. The aircraft is also equipped with the Lynx Multi-mode Radar that contains synthetic aperture radar (SAR) that can operate in both spotlight and strip modes, and ground moving target indication (GMTI) with Dismount Moving Target Indicator (DMTI) and Maritime Wide-Area Search (MWAS) capabilities.

The Reaper was used as a test bed for Gorgon Stare, a wide-area surveillance sensor system. The system has 368 cameras capable of capturing five million pixels each to create an image of about 1.8 billion pixels; video is collected at 12 frames per second, producing several terabytes of data per minute.

In January 2012, General Atomics released a new trailing arm design for the Reaper's main landing gear. In April 2012, General Atomics announced possible upgrades to USAF Reapers, including two extra  fuel pods under the wings to increase endurance to 37 hours.

The USAF has bought 38 Reaper Extended Range (ER) versions, carrying external fuel tanks (which don't affect weapon capacity), the heavy-weight landing gear, a four-bladed propeller, a new fuel management system which ensures fuel and thermal balance among external tank, wing, and fuselage fuel sources, and an alcohol-water injection (AWI) system to shorten required runway takeoff length. These features increase endurance from 27 to 33–35 hours, while the company is still pitching the lengthened wing option. The Reaper ER first flew operationally in August 2015.

The aircraft also has the sensor ball replaced with a high-definition camera, better communications so ground controllers can see the higher quality video, software to enable automatic detection of threats and tracking of 12 moving targets at once, and the ability to "super ripple" fire missiles within 0.32 seconds of each other.

On 25 February 2016, General Atomics announced a successful test flight of the new Predator-B/ER version. Other improvements include "short-field takeoff and landing performance and spoilers on the wings which enable precision automatic landings. The wings also have provisions for leading-edge de-ice and integrated low- and high-band RF antennas."

Operational history

U.S. Air Force

On 1 May 2007, the USAF's 432nd Wing was activated to operate MQ-9 Reaper as well as MQ-1 Predator UAVs at Creech Air Force Base, Nevada. The pilots first conducted combat missions in Iraq and Afghanistan in the summer of 2007. On 28 October 2007, the Air Force Times reported an MQ-9 had achieved its first "kill", successfully firing a Hellfire missile against Afghanistan insurgents in the Deh Rawood region of the mountainous Oruzgan province. By 6 March 2008, according to USAF Lieutenant General Gary North, the Reaper had attacked 16 targets in Afghanistan using  bombs and Hellfire missiles.

On 17 July 2008, the USAF began flying Reaper missions within Iraq from Balad Air Base. It was reported on 11 August 2008 that the 174th Fighter Wing would consist entirely of Reapers. By March 2009 the USAF had 28 operational Reapers. Beginning in September 2009, Reapers were deployed by the Africa Command to the Seychelles islands for use in Indian Ocean anti-piracy patrols.

On 13 September 2009, positive control of an MQ-9 was lost during a combat mission over Afghanistan, after which the control-less drone started flying towards the Afghan border with Tajikistan. An F-15E Strike Eagle fired an AIM-9 missile at the drone, successfully destroying its engine. Before the drone impacted the ground, contact was reestablished with the drone, and it was flown into a mountain to destroy it. It was the first US drone to be destroyed intentionally by allied forces.

By July 2010, thirty-eight Predators and Reapers had been lost during combat operations in Afghanistan and Iraq, another nine were lost in training missions in the U.S. In 2010, the USAF conducted over 33,000 close air support missions, a more-than-20 percent increase compared with 2009. By March 2011, the USAF had 48 Predator and Reaper combat air patrols flying in Iraq and Afghanistan compared with 18 in 2007.

As of March 2011, the USAF was training more pilots for advanced unmanned aerial vehicles than for any other single weapons system. In 2012, the Reaper, Predator and Global Hawk were described as "... the most accident-prone aircraft in the Air Force fleet."

In October 2011, the USAF began operating Reapers out of Arba Minch Airport in Ethiopia for surveillance-only operations in Somalia. In 2012, both Reapers and Predators were deployed in Benghazi, Libya after the attack that killed the US ambassador in that city. In February 2013, the U.S. stationed a Predator at Niamey to provide intelligence for French forces during Operation Serval in Mali; it was later replaced by two MQ-9 Reapers. In April 2013, one of these Reapers crashed on a surveillance flight due to mechanical failure.

On 22 October 2013, the USAF's fleets of MQ-1 Predator and MQ-9 Reaper UAVs reached 2,000,000 flight hours. The RPA program began in the mid-1990s, taking 16 years for them to reach 1 million flight hours; the 2 million hour mark was reached just two and a half years later.

The high demand for UAVs has caused Air Combat Command to increase pilot output from 188 in 2015 to 300 in 2017 at Holloman.

On 13 November 2015, the Pentagon reported that an MQ-9 had killed ISIL member Mohammed Emwazi, popularly known as "Jihadi John", who was responsible for executing several Western prisoners.

In 2015, a record number (20) of USAF drones crashed; investigators identified three parts of the starter-generator that were susceptible to breakdowns, but could not determine why they were failing. Col. William S. Leister informed Pentagon officials that investigators from the USAF, General Atomics and Skurka had investigated the problem for more than a year. The team, he said, had identified "numerous manufacturing quality issues" yet had been unable to determine the exact cause of the failures.

On 2 October 2017, U.S. Central Command stated that an MQ-9 had been shot down by Houthi air defense systems over Sanaa in western Yemen the previous day.  The aircraft took off from Chabelley Airport in Djibouti, and was armed.

On 18 September 2018, the USAF announced that an MQ-9 armed with an air-to-air missile successfully shot down a smaller target drone in November 2017. The drone was operated by the 432nd Wing. While the destruction of a target drone is a routine USAF exercise, this event was the first instance of a Reaper destroying a small, maneuvering aerial target.

On 6 June 2019, Houthis shot down a US MQ-9 Reaper over Yemen. According to United States Central Command, it was shot down by an SA-6 surface-to-air missile that was enabled with Iranian assistance. On 21 August 2019, another unarmed MQ-9 was shot down by Houthis over Dhamar, Yemen, by a Yemini made Fater-1 missile, an improved SA-6.

On 23 November 2019, a US MQ-9 Reaper was shot down by a Pantsir system operated by the Libyan National Army or Wagner Group over Tripoli, Libya. According to journalist David Cenciotti, the drone was lost after being jammed by Russian Wagner militias working in support of the Libyan National Army.

On 3 January 2020, a US MQ-9 missile strike at Baghdad International Airport killed Qasem Soleimani, the commander of the Iranian Quds Force, and Abu Mahdi al-Muhandis, the deputy commander of Iraqi Popular Mobilization Forces.

On 18 August 2020, US Department of Defense announced that two US MQ-9 Reapers had crashed in a mid-air collision over Syria. However, claims from local media said that at least one drone might have been shot down by Syrian Opposition rebel fighters or Turkish forces.

In April 2021, U.S. and Polish militaries have agreed on a long-negotiated plan to increase the American presence in Poland with two units of MQ-9 Reapers deployed by the USAF.

On 14 July 2022, a MQ-9 Reaper operated by the 25th Attack Group crashed during a training mission in Romania. The MQ-9 drones have been deployed to the Romanian 71st Air Base in 2021, starting their operational flights on 1 February 2021.

On 14 March 2023, one of two intercepting Su-27 fighters of the Russian Federation collided with an MQ-9 Reaper flying in international airspace over the Black Sea. In a statement, US Air Force Gen. James Hecker, commander of the United States Air Forces in Europe – Air Forces Africa, stated, "At approximately 7:03 am (CET), one of the Russian Su-27 aircraft struck the propeller of the MQ-9, causing U.S. forces to have to bring the MQ-9 down in international waters. Several times before the collision, the Su-27s dumped fuel on and flew in front of the MQ-9 in a reckless, environmentally unsound and unprofessional manner. This incident demonstrates a lack of competence in addition to being unsafe and unprofessional." Russia says it will attempt to retrieve the drone.

The US government claimed that it was prepared for such an outcome. John Kirby, National Security Council Coordinator for Strategic Communications, said that "their ability to exploit useful intelligence will be highly minimised". While the US Chairman of the Joint Chiefs of Staff Gen. Mark A. Milley said that there were "mitigating measures" to ensure that Russia obtained no access to valuable tech. While Brigadier General Pat Ryder claimed that drone was "unflyable and uncontrollable" and it likely damaged the Su-27 during the collision. The US has since released footage over the Black Sea.

NASA

The National Aeronautics and Space Administration (NASA) initially expressed interest in a production version of the B-002 turbofan-powered variant, but instead leased an unarmed Reaper variant, which carries the GA-ASI company name "Altair". Altair is one of the first three "Predator-B" airframes.

The Altair has enhanced avionics systems to better enable flights in FAA-controlled civil airspace and demonstrate "over-the-horizon" command and control capability from a ground station. These aircraft are used by NASA's Earth Science Enterprise as part of the NASA ERAST Program to perform on-location science missions.

In November 2006, NASA's Dryden Flight Research Center obtained an MQ-9 (and mobile ground control station), named Ikhana, for the Suborbital Science Program within the Science Mission Directorate. In 2007, Ikhana was used to survey the Southern California wildfires, supporting firefighter deployments based upon the highest need. The California Office of Emergency Services requested NASA support for the Esperanza Fire, and the General Atomics Altair was launched less than 24 hours later on a 16-hour mission to map the fire's perimeter. The fire mapping research is a joint project with NASA and the US Forest Service.

The NASA Ikhana was used to survey the descent of the Orion Exploration Flight Test 1 (EFT-1) module on its first test mission 5 December 2014.

U.S. Homeland Security

U.S. Customs and Border Protection (CBP) operated nine MQ-9s in August 2012.  Two were based in North Dakota at Grand Forks Air Force Base, four were based in Arizona, at Fort Huachuca and one was based at the Naval Air Station Corpus Christi, Texas. These aircraft were equipped with GA-ASI's Lynx synthetic aperture radar and Raytheon's MTS-B electro-optical infrared sensors.

The CBP also had two maritime MQ-9s called Guardians, based at Cape Canaveral Air Force Station, Florida and Naval Air Station Corpus Christi, Texas. The Guardians were equipped with the SeaVue marine search radar; their electro-optical infrared sensor was optimized for maritime operations. The CBP operates one MQ-9 Guardian jointly with the U.S. Coast Guard (USCG) out of land-based stations in Florida and Texas.

The United States Department of Homeland Security initially ordered one Predator B for border protection duty, referred to as MQ-9 CBP-101. It began operations 4 October 2005 and crashed in the Arizona desert on 25 April 2006. The US's NTSB determined that the crash's most likely cause was pilot error by the ground-based pilot, inadvertently shutting down the UAV's engine by failing to follow the checklist. During its operational period, the aircraft flew 959 hours on patrol and played a role in 2,309 arrests.

A second Predator B, called "CBP-104" (initially referred to as "CBP-102"), was delivered in September 2006 and commenced limited border protection operations on 18 October 2006. The president's FY2006 emergency supplemental budget request added $45 million for the program and the FY2007 Homeland Security Appropriations Bill added an additional $20 million. In October 2006, GA-ASI announced a $33.9 million contract to supply two more Predator B systems by the fall of 2007. On 16 February 2009, the program was further expanded to include patrols of the Canada–US border.

On 14 October 2013, an MQ-9 began patrolling the Manitoba portion of the U.S.-Canada border. The UAV is based at Grand Forks Air Force Base and will watch the -long border. The drone will not carry weapons and needs permission to enter Canadian airspace. U.S. authorities fear that drug smugglers, migrants, and terrorists may exploit the long border. The use of the unmanned surveillance aircraft is an enhancement of the partnership between U.S. and Canadian agencies.

In January 2014, Customs and Border Protection grounded its UAVs temporarily after an unmanned aircraft was ditched off the coast of California by the operator due to a mechanical failure on 27 January 2014.

On 29 May 2020, during the George Floyd protests, CBP flew an unarmed Predator B drone above Minneapolis to watch protesters. The agency said it was at the request of federal law enforcement in Minneapolis.

Other users

Belgium
In January 2018, the Belgian Ministry of Defence reportedly decided on the MQ-9 to fulfill its medium-altitude long-range UAV requirement. Ministry officials stated that a request for information had been sent to potential suppliers of the system, and that they had received responses from all of them. In October 2018, Belgium confirmed its selection of the MQ-9B SkyGuardian variant, adding that it would be considered a "reconnaissance" asset, suggesting it will not be used to carry weapons. In March 2019, the US Department of State approved the sale of four MQ-9B SkyGuardian UAVs to Belgium for $600 million, pending approval by US Congress. In July 2022, work began on adapting the Florennes Air Base to host, fly and maintain the planes.

Dominican Republic
The Predator UAV "Guardian" has been used by the Dominican Republic, under U.S. supervision and funding, against drug trafficking from mid-2012.

France
On 31 May 2013, French Defense Minister Jean-Yves Le Drian confirmed the order of two MQ-9 Reapers, to be delivered by the end of 2013. It was chosen to replace the EADS Harfang and was picked over the Israeli Heron TP. On 27 June 2013, the U.S. Defense Security Cooperation Agency notified Congress of a possible Foreign Military Sale to France for 16 unarmed MQ-9s, associated equipment, ground control hardware, and support, worth up to $1.5 billion total. On 26 August 2013, France and the US Department of Defense concluded the deal for 16 Reapers and 8 ground control stations, with French operators beginning training.

On 24 September 2013, France's first pair of MQ-9 pilots conducted a two-hour training sortie at Holloman Air Force Base, New Mexico.  Both French pilots had prior UAV experience and went through a five-week ground-based training course and 5 hours on a flight simulator before the first flight. Two additional crews were also receiving instruction at the facility. General Atomics is due to deliver two Reapers and one ground control station to the French Air Force by the end of 2013. On 26 November 2013, France declared that six pilots in three teams were operational, following 100 hours on flight simulators and 4 flights. French MQ-9s were first put into action in January 2014 at Niamey Air Base in Niger for border reconnaissance in the Sahel desert.

On 16 January 2014, France's first MQ-9 flight occurred from Niger. The first two Reapers to enter French service are designated Block 1 and use U.S. equipment; further orders are to be modified with European payloads such as sensors and datalinks. On 31 March 2014, French Air Force Reapers accumulated 500 flight hours in support of Operation Serval. In July 2014, a French MQ-9 helped to locate the wreckage of Air Algérie Flight 5017, which had crashed in Mali.

Germany
Germany made a request to purchase five Reapers and four ground control stations, plus related support material and training. The request, being made through the Foreign Military Sales process, was presented to Congress through the Defense Security Cooperation Agency on 1 August 2008 and is valued at US$205 million. However, Germany did not go through with this procurement for the time being and decided to lease the IAI Heron offered by IAI and Rheinmetall instead, initially for the duration of one year, representing a stop-gap measure before a long-term decision on a MALE-system is being made.

Greece 
On 21 April 2022, a well-known Greek military journalist revealed in an interview that the Hellenic Air Force is discussing the purchase of three MQ-9 UCAVs along with the Israeli Heron TPs. Given that the US Air Force has long been operating MQ-9s from Larissa Air Base, Greece has some past experience with it from joint exercises. On 5 July 2022, the Hellenic Parliament approved the acquisition of 3 MQ-9B SeaGuardian UAVs along with two ground stations. On 28 July 2022, the Greek Minister of Nation Defence, Nikolaos Panagiotopoulos, confirmed the acquisition of the three UAVs.

India
In June 2017, the US State Department approved the sale of 22 drones to India, costing around $2–3 billion. As of February 2020, a deal to purchase 30 drones with 10 drones for each of the three Indian armed services, was expected to be signed by the end of the fiscal year. In November 2020, the Indian Navy began operating two leased MQ-9B SeaGuardians. The lease agreement was valid for one year and has been extended subsequently. The drones are deployed at the Naval Air Station Rajali located in Tamil Nadu. and it had logged close to 3,000 hours covering over 14 million square miles of operating area by August 2022. In February 2022, it was reported that Indian Navy had put the deal on the backburner and was instead looking at more indigenous options from the DRDO as well as upgrading its current fleet of IAI Heron drones. On 27 February 2022, PTI reported that the procurement for the 30 armed Predator B drones – 10 each for the Indian Army, Indian Navy and Indian Air Force is in the advanced stage and disputed earlier reports of the deal being put on the backburner with India reportedly providing "good feedback" on the SeaGuardians already on lease.

Italy
On 1 August 2008, Italy submitted a FMS request through the Defense Security Cooperation Agency for four aircraft, four ground stations and five years of maintenance support, all valued at US$330 million. Italy ordered two more aircraft in November 2009. On 30 May 2012, it was reported that the U.S. planned to sell kits to arm Italy's six Reapers with Hellfire missiles and laser-guided bombs. However Gen. Alberto Rosso has expressed frustration at American delays in integrating additional weapons onto the platform and suggested that Italy may have to seek UAS alternatives. Italian Reapers were used:
 in Libya, since 10 August 2011, as part of its contribution to NATO's Operation Unified Protector (flew about 300 hours)
 in Kosovo, since 13 March 2012 inbound NATO KFOR "Joint Enterprise" operation
 on "Mare Nostrum" mission (Mediterranean sea, migrants search and rescue operation) by October 2013
 into Afghanistan theater by January 2014 (to replace Predator A+).

On 3 November 2015, the U.S. approved a deal covering weapons integration onto Italy's Reaper aircraft, which would make it the first country outside the UK to weaponize the drone.  The potential for increased contribution to NATO coalition operations improved operational flexibility, and enhanced survivability for Italian forces prompted the request.

On 20 November 2019, an Italian Air Force MQ-9 was shot down by a Pantsir system operated by the Libyan National Army or Wagner Group, near the city of Tarhuna, Libya. The Libyan National Army claimed to have shot down the drone that, based on the initial reports, was thought to be a Turkish operated drone, supporting the opposed Government of National Accord. The Italian Defense confirmed the loss stating the cause of the crash is under investigation.

Netherlands
On 19 June 2013, General Atomics and Fokker Technologies signed a Memorandum of Understanding (MOU) to offer the MQ-9 Reaper to the Dutch government for their need of a MALE UAV. The MOU recognizes that Fokker will assist in maintenance and support of the aircraft in the Netherlands if a deal goes through.

On 21 November 2013, the Dutch Minister of Defense announced that the Royal Netherlands Air Force (RNLAF) has selected the MQ-9 Reaper Block-V as its new MALE UAV. The new MALE UAV 306 squadron will be based at Leeuwarden Air Base. In July 2018 the Dutch government signed a Letter of Acceptance for the acquisition through the Foreign Military Sales process.

The Dutch MQ-9 is to have the Synthetic Aperture Radar with the Maritime Search option and also a special ground search radar with more range and electronic sensors to detect ground radar and signals.  The RNLAF bought four ground stations (two at Homebase, two at forward operating base) and four MQ-9s Block-V. The aircraft are to reach full operational status in 2023. Four more systems are planned. The decision was also made to arm the Reapers.

Spain
On 6 August 2015, the Spanish Ministry of Defence announced it would buy four Reaper surveillance aircraft with two ground control stations for €25 million ($27 million) in 2016, costing €171 million over five years.  General Atomics will partner with Spanish Company SENER to deliver unarmed versions to Spain, making it the fifth European country to order the Reaper.  In addition to selecting the Reaper, Spain is interested in the joint German-French-Italian project to develop a European MALE UAV.

The Defense Department cleared the purchase on 6 October 2015.  Spain selected the Reaper over the Heron TP to perform homeland security, counter-insurgency, and counter-terrorism operations. The Spanish government agreed to purchase the system on 30 October. The Reaper was selected over the Heron TP mainly for commonality with NATO allies who also use the airframe.  Although Spain's immediate priority is for surveillance, they will eventually try to weaponize the platform.  The first two aircraft and first GCS is planned for delivery in 2017, with the third aircraft in 2018 when they achieve IOC, and the last in 2020 achieving full operational capability (FOC).

United Kingdom

On 27 September 2006, the U.S. Congress was notified by the Defense Security Cooperation Agency that the United Kingdom was seeking to purchase a pair of MQ-9A Reapers. They were initially operated by No. 39 Squadron from Creech Air Force Base, Nevada, later moving to RAF Waddington. A third MQ-9A was in the process of being purchased by the RAF in 2007. On 9 November 2007, the UK Ministry of Defence (MoD) announced that its Reapers had begun operations in Afghanistan against the Taliban. In April 2008, following the crash of one of the UK's two Reapers, British special forces were sent to recover sensitive material from the wreckage before it was blown up to prevent the enemy from obtaining it. By May 2011, five Reapers were in operation, with a further five on order.

The second RAF squadron to operate five Reapers is No. XIII Squadron, which was formally activated and commissioned on 26 October 2012. No. 39 Squadron personnel were planned to gradually return to the UK in 2013 and in time both squadrons would each operate five Reapers from RAF Waddington. In April 2013, XIII Squadron started full operations from RAF Waddington, exercising control over a complement of 10 Reapers, at that point all based in Afghanistan.

Five Reapers can provide 36 hours of combined surveillance coverage in Afghanistan with individual sorties lasting up to 16 hours. A further five vehicles increases this to 72 hours. In total, RAF Reapers flew 71,000 flight hours in Afghanistan, and dropped 510 guided weapons (compared to 497 for Harrier and Tornado).

In April 2013, it was revealed that the MoD was studying the adoption of MBDA's Brimstone missile upon the MQ-9. In December 2013, several successful test firings of the Brimstone missile from a Reaper at Naval Air Weapons Station China Lake to support integration onto RAF Reapers.

In 2014, the MoD decided that its Reaper fleet will be brought into the RAF's core fleet once operations over Afghanistan cease.  Procurement of the MQ-9A was via an urgent operational capability requirement and funded from the Treasury reserve, but induction into the core fleet will have them funded from the MoD's budget. The Reapers were retained for contingent purposes, mainly to perform intelligence, surveillance and reconnaissance (ISR), until its replacement enters service around 2018. On 4 October 2015 David Cameron announced that the RAF would replace its existing fleet of 10 Reapers with more than 20 of the "latest generation of RPAS", named as "Protector",

In an April 2016 document, the MoD revealed that Protector will be a version of the MQ-9B SkyGuardian, formally known as Certifiable Predator B (CPB), made to fly in European airspace, to be acquired from 2018 to 2030. In July 2018, it was announced that this aircraft will be designated Protector RG Mk 1 in RAF service, and is to be delivered in 2023.

On 16 October 2014, the MoD announced the deployment of armed Reapers in Operation Shader, the UK's contribution to the United States-led military intervention against Islamic State, the first occasion the UK had used its Reapers outside Afghanistan. The number of aircraft out of the RAF's 10-plane fleet was not disclosed, but it was expected that at least two were sent; more were dispatched as the UK drew down from Afghanistan. RAF Reapers' primary purpose is to provide surveillance support and situational awareness to coalition forces. On 10 November 2014, the MoD reported that an RAF Reaper had conducted its first airstrike against Islamic State forces, firing a Hellfire missile at militants placing an IED near Bayji.

RAF Reapers based at RAF Akrotiri in Cyprus conducted one surveillance mission over Syria in November 2014, four in December 2014, and eight in January 2015. On 7 September 2015, Prime Minister David Cameron announced that two Islamic State fighters from Britain had been killed in an intelligence-led strike by an RAF Reaper near Raqqa, Syria, the first armed use of RAF assets in Syria during the civil war. By January 2016, RAF Reapers had flown 1,000 sorties in support of Operation Shader. Compared to operations in Afghanistan, where RAF Reapers fired 16 Hellfire missiles in 2008, 93 in 2013, and 94 in 2014, in operations against ISIL, 258 Hellfires were fired in 2015.

United Arab Emirates
On 10 November 2020, the US State Department approved the sale of up to 18 MQ-9Bs to the UAE pending approval by Congress.

Taiwan
On 3 November 2020, the US State Department approved the sale of 4 MQ-9B, along with Control Stations and Embedded Global Positioning System/Inertial Navigations Systems (EGI) with Selective Availability Anti-Spoofing Module (SAASM) to Taiwan.

Japan 
On 15 October 2020, General Atomics Aeronautical Systems conducted validation flights of the SeaGuardian UAV for the Japan Coast Guard (JCG). The test flight was conducted at a Japan Maritime Self-Defense Force (JMSDF) air base in Hachinohe. Both the JCG and JMSDF have expressed interest in acquiring SeaGuardian UAVs in order to conduct more ocean surveillance.

On 15 March 2023, the JMSDF will acquire a MQ-9B SeaGuardian for trials as part of its Medium-Altitude, Long-Endurance (MALE) RPAS Trial Operation Project.

Morocco 
After the Israel–Morocco normalization agreement in 2020, the US is to approve the sale of four MQ-9B SeaGuardians to Morocco.

Potential operators

Finland 
Finnish Defence Forces is doing test flights with the MQ-9.

Poland 
The Polish Ministry of National Defense announced on 28 February 2022 that it plans to purchase an unspecified number of MQ-9 Reaper drones.

Cancelled acquisitions

Australia
In September 2006, the General Atomics Mariner demonstrator aircraft was operated by the Australian Defence Science and Technology Group (DSTO) in an exercise designed to evaluate the aircraft's ability to aid in efforts to stem illegal fishing, drug running and illegal immigration. The Mariner operated from Royal Australian Air Force bases Edinburgh, South Australia and Learmonth, Western Australia in conjunction with a Royal Australian Navy Armidale class patrol boat, the Joint Offshore Protection Command, and the Pilbara Regiment.

In February 2015, it was announced that six RAAF personnel had been sent to Holloman AFB, New Mexico and Creech AFB, Nevada to undergo training.

In August 2015, it was revealed that Australians had begun flying MQ-9s over Syria, the first time Australia expanded operations past Iraq during the Military intervention against the Islamic State of Iraq and the Levant.  Five RAAF personnel were embedded with the USAF 432nd Operations Group, which flies armed Reapers, performing operational duties with the unit as MQ-9 system pilots and sensor operators.

In November 2018, the Defence Minister Christopher Pyne announced that Australia would purchase 12 to 16 MQ-9s. In November 2019, Australia announced the selection of the MQ-9B for its armed Medium-Altitude Long-Endurance (MALE) RPAS requirement under Project Air 7003.

In April 2021, the State Department approved a possible Foreign Military Sale to the Government of Australia of 12 MQ-9B Reapers and related equipment for an estimated cost of $1.651 billion.

The Australian Government canceled the planned Reaper acquisition in March 2022. The funding intended for the project was redirected to expanding the Australian Signals Directorate.

Variants

SeaGuardian
A navalized Reaper, named Mariner, was proposed for the U.S. Navy's Broad Area Maritime Surveillance (BAMS) program.  It had an increased fuel capacity for an endurance of up to 49 hours. Variations included one for aircraft carrier operations with folding wings for storage, shortened, reinforced landing gear, an arresting hook, cut-down or eliminated ventral flight surfaces and six stores pylons for a total load of 3,000 pounds (1,360 kilograms). The Northrop Grumman RQ-4N was selected as the BAMS winner.

US Customs and Border Protection (CBP) operates two maritime variants of the MQ-9, known as Guardians. The U.S. Coast Guard evaluated the Guardian, including performing joint operations with CBP. CBP and the Coast Guard operate one MQ-9 Guardian jointly out of land-based stations in Florida and Texas.

General Atomics continued with the Naval Reaper concept, turning it into the SeaGuardian. A key part of its mission set is the Leonardo Seaspray 7500E V2 AESA radar mounted as a centerline pod with inverse synthetic aperture radar that can spot surface targets including ships, submarine periscopes, and people during search and rescue operations.

General Atomics studied testing a sonobuoy launch capability from the Guardian in 2016 to demonstrate its ability to carry them, control them, and send information back to the ground station over a SATCOM link. In November 2020, a company-owned Reaper carried out a trial releasing sonobuoys, then processing information from them to track a training target. This led to the creation of an anti-submarine warfare package for the SeaGuardian, the first self-contained ASW package for a UAS. The package comprises podded sonobuoy dispenser systems (SDS), using a pneumatic launch system to launch 10 A-size or 20 G-size buoys from each pod, and a sonobuoy management and control system (SMCS); the aircraft can carry up to four pods.

MQ-9 Block 5
On 24 May 2012, General Atomics conducted the successful first flight of its upgraded MQ-9 Block 1-plus Reaper. The Block 1-plus version was designed for increased electrical power, secure communications, automatic landing, increased gross takeoff weight (GTOW), weapons growth, and streamlined payload integration capabilities. A new high-capacity starter generator offers increased electrical power capacity to provide growth capacity; a backup generator is also present and is sufficient for all flight-critical functions, improving the electrical power system's reliability via three independent power sources.

New communications capabilities, including dual ARC-210 VHF/UHF radios with wingtip antennas, allow for simultaneous communications between multiple air-to-air and air-to-ground parties, secure data links, and an increased data transmission capacity. The new trailing arm main landing gear allows the carriage of heavier payloads or additional fuel. Development and testing were completed, and Milestone C was achieved in September 2012.  Follow-on aircraft will be redesignated MQ-9 Block 5. On 15 October 2013, the USAF awarded General Atomics a $377.4 million contract for 24 MQ-9 Block 5 Reapers. The MQ-9 Block 5 flew its first combat mission on 23 June 2017.

SkyGuardian

International demand for a MALE RPAS capable of being certified for operation within civilian airspace drove General Atomics to develop a version of the platform known by GA-ASI as MQ-9B SkyGuardian, previously called Certifiable Predator B, to make it compliant with European flight regulations to get more sales in European countries. In order to fly over national airspace, the aircraft meets NATO STANAG 4671 airworthiness requirements with lightning protection, different composite materials, and sense and avoid technology.

Features include High Definition EO/IR Full Motion Video sensor, De/Anti-Icing System, TCAS, and Automatic Take-Off & Land. The system also includes a completely redesigned & modernized integrated ground control station with 4 crew stations.

On 28 November 2019, the Australian Government announced the selection of the General Atomics Aeronautical Systems (GA-ASI) MQ-9B SkyGuardian as its preferred version of the Predator B for the RAAF's Project AIR 7003 MALE armed remotely piloted aircraft system (RPAS) requirement.

The SeaGuardian is a proposed version of SkyGuardian but also fitted with Multimode 360 Maritime Surface Search Radar and automatic identification system (AIS).

Protector
In April 2016, the United Kingdom announced that it intended to place an order for the Certifiable Predator B as part of its Protector MALE UAV program for the Royal Air Force. According to the 2015 Strategic Defence and Security Review, the Royal Air Force will operate at least 20 Protector systems by 2025, replacing all of the ten MQ-9A Reapers.

On 15 July 2018, a GA-ASI Company-owned MQ-9B SkyGuardian was flown from the United States to RAF Fairford in the UK for the first transatlantic flight of a MALE UAV. It was displayed at the Royal International Air Tattoo (RIAT) air show, where the aircraft was given markings of No. 31 Squadron. This followed an announcement by the RAF's Chief of Air Staff that No. 31 Squadron would be the first RAF Squadron to operate a similar version of the MQ-9B aircraft, to be known as the Protector RG Mark 1 (RG1), starting in 2023. In July 2020, the Ministry of Defence signed a contract for three Protector UAVs with an option on an additional thirteen aircraft. It was announced in September 2021 that No. XIII Squadron will become the second Protector squadron.

Protector will be able to carry up to 18 Brimstone 2 missiles or Paveway IV bombs.

Operators

 French Air and Space Force (Armée de l'air et de l'espace)
 Cognac – Châteaubernard Air Base, Charente
Escadron de Drones 1/33 Belfort

 Indian Navy – 2 on lease since Nov. 2020.
INS Rajali, Tamil Nadu

 Italian Air Force (Aeronautica Militare)
Amendola Air Base, Province of Foggia
 32° Stormo
28° Gruppo
Naval Air Station Sigonella, Sicily
 32° Stormo
61° Gruppo Volo

 Japan Coast Guard - At least one SeaGuardian in operational use since October 2022.

 Royal Netherlands Air Force – 4 on order as of 2020, 4 more to be ordered in 2022
 Leeuwarden Air Base, Friesland
No. 306 Squadron

 Spanish Air and Space Force
Talavera la Real Air Base, Extremadura
 ALA 23
 233 Escuadrón

 
 Royal Air Force – 10 ordered with 9 in active service. 1 more ordered in March 2021.
 RAF Waddington, Lincolnshire 
No. XIII Squadron
 No. 54 Squadron (Operational Conversion Unit)
Creech Air Force Base, Nevada
No. 39 Squadron

 United States Air Force
Air Combat Command
 49th Wing (Holloman Air Force Base, New Mexico)
6th Attack Squadron
16th Training Squadron
9th Attack Squadron
 29th Attack Squadron
 53d Wing (Eglin Air Force Base, Florida)
 556th Test and Evaluation Squadron (Creech Air Force Base, Nevada)
 432nd Wing (Creech Air Force Base, Nevada)
 11th Attack Squadron
 15th Attack Squadron
 20th Attack Squadron (Whiteman Air Force Base, Missouri)
 22nd Attack Squadron
 50th Attack Squadron (Shaw Air Force Base, South Carolina)
 89th Attack Squadron (Ellsworth Air Force Base, South Dakota)
 482nd Attack Squadron (Shaw Air Force Base, South Carolina)
 489th Attack Squadron
United States Air Forces in Europe – Air Forces Africa
 31st Expeditionary Operations Group
 Detachment 1 (71st Air Base, Romania)
 52nd Expeditionary Operations Group
 Detachment 2 (12th Air Base, Poland)
 Air Force Special Operations Command
 27th Special Operations Wing (Cannon Air Force Base, New Mexico)
 33d Special Operations Squadron
 58th Special Operations Wing (Kirtland Air Force Base, New Mexico)
 551st Special Operations Squadron
 Air National Guard
107th Attack Wing (Niagara Falls Air Force Base, New York)
136th Attack Squadron
 174th Attack Wing (Hancock Field Air National Guard Base, New York)
138th Attack Squadron
 111th Attack Wing (Horsham Air Guard Station, Montgomery, Pennsylvania)
103rd Attack Squadron
 118th Wing (118 WG) (Berry Field, Nashville, Tennessee)
105th Attack Squadron
 132nd Wing (Des Moines Air National Guard Base, Des Moines, Iowa)
124th Attack Squadron
 147th Attack Wing (147 ATKW) (Ellington Field Joint Reserve Base, Houston, Texas)
111th Reconnaissance Squadron
163d Attack Wing (March AFB, California)
 196th Attack Squadron
 160th Attack Squadron
178th Wing (Springfield-Beckley Air National Guard Station, Springfield, Ohio)
188th Wing (188 WG) (Ebbing Air National Guard Station, Fort Smith, Arkansas)
184th Attack Squadron
110th Wing (Battle Creek Air National Guard Base, Battle Creek, Michigan)
172d Attack Squadron
Air Force Reserve Command
919th Special Operations Wing (Duke Field, Florida)
2nd Special Operations Squadron
 U.S. Customs and Border Protection
 Sierra Vista, Arizona
 Grand Forks Air Force Base, North Dakota
 Cape Canaveral Air Force Station, Florida
 Naval Air Station Corpus Christi, Texas

Specifications (MQ-9A)

See also

References

This article contains material that originally came from the web article Unmanned Aerial Vehicles by Greg Goebel, which exists in the public domain.

External links

 MQ-9 Predator Factsheet on U.S. Air Force site
 General Atomics Aeronautical Systems YMQ-9 Reaper – National Museum of the United States Air Force
 MQ-9 "Reaper" Predator B UAV Defense-Update.com
 General Atomics MQ-9 Reaper (Predator B), Designation-Systems.net

Q-09 Reaper
Airborne military robots
Signals intelligence
Single-engined pusher aircraft
Unmanned aerial vehicles of the United States
2000s United States attack aircraft
2000s United States military reconnaissance aircraft
War on terror
Synthetic aperture radar
Aircraft first flown in 2001
Single-engined turboprop aircraft
Unmanned military aircraft of the United States